Alexander Sergeyevich Serebryakov (born September 28, 1987) is a Russian former professional cyclist. During his career, Serebryakov served a four-year doping ban, between April 2013 and April 2017.

Major results

2008
 2nd Ruota d'Oro
2010
 1st Piccolo Giro di Lombardia
 5th GP Industrie del Marmo
 7th Ruota d'Oro
2011
 1st Giro del Casentino
 3rd Grand Prix of Moscow
 6th Trofeo Franco Balestra
 7th Overall Five Rings of Moscow
1st Stages 3 & 5 
2012
 1st Philadelphia International Championship
 Tour of China I
1st Stages 2 & 5
 Tour of China II
1st Stages 1 & 2
 5th Kuurne-Brussels-Kuurne
 7th Overall Tour de Korea
1st Stage 5
 7th Overall Tour of Taihu Lake
1st Stages 3 & 5 
 Tour of Hainan
1st  Points classification
1st Stages 3, 4 & 9

References

External links

1987 births
Living people
Russian male cyclists
Doping cases in cycling
Russian sportspeople in doping cases
People from Arzamas
Sportspeople from Nizhny Novgorod Oblast